Richard Edwards Rumble (October 26, 1922 – March 1, 2022) was a rear admiral in the United States Navy. He was a former commandant of the Fifth Naval District (1974–1976) and First Naval District. He died on March 1, 2022, at the age of 99.

References

1922 births
2022 deaths
People from San Diego
United States Navy rear admirals
Burials at Arlington National Cemetery